Göllingen is a village and a former municipality in the district Kyffhäuserkreis, in Thuringia, Germany. Since 31 December 2012, it is part of the municipality Kyffhäuserland.

References

Former municipalities in Thuringia
Schwarzburg-Rudolstadt